The Pietermaritzburg Ring Road, also known as The Pietermaritzburg Bypass is a halfway ring road that circles the city of Pietermaritzburg, South Africa. It is part of the N3 National Route.

Route 
The Half Ring Road is fully formed by the N3 freeway. The 9 km half ring road follows east around Pietermaritzburg (bypassing the city centre). It starts at the R103 split in the northern suburb of Athlone and ends at the R56 merge in the southern suburb of Scottsville.

See also 

 Ring Roads in South Africa

References 

Ring roads in South Africa

N3 road (South Africa)